Valiabad (also Romanized as Valīābād) is a village in Jangal Rural District, in the Central District of Fasa County, Fars Province, Iran. At the 2006 census, its population was 31, in 8 families.

References 

Populated places in Fasa County